Pashtun Zarghun is located at 1042 m altitude at the center of the Pashtun Zarghun District and is situated in its central part.

References

See also
Herat Province

Populated places in Herat Province